Diorella Regine De Leon Angeles (born October 29, 1985) is a Filipina model and actress. She started her showbiz career after winning Be Bench / The Model Search of ABS-CBN and then becoming one of ABS-CBN's Star Magic talents.

She is a member of the Christian organization, Iglesia ni Cristo.

Filmography

Television

Movies

References

Living people
Filipino female models
Filipino television actresses
1985 births
Star Magic personalities
Members of Iglesia ni Cristo
Participants in Philippine reality television series
Reality show winners
Reality modeling competition participants
People from Quezon City
Actresses from Metro Manila